MegaVision is an American company that manufactures high-end digital photographic equipment. It was founded in 1983 to create a state-of-the-art image processing computer. MegaVision was the first company to produce a digital camera back for sale, using a 4 megapixel vidicon tube behind a Cambo technical view camera. MegaVision has always produced the capture software that controls their camera hardware. MegaVision produced the first live focus video in a digital still camera porting video over twisted pair wires (1993).  MegaVision produced the first gamut alarm light metering with their Color Coded Light Metering (1993).  MegaVision produced the first RAW file removable media digital camera with the Batpac digitizer and the S2/S3 series camera backs (1996).  MegaVision produced the first computer mounted digital camera back using the E3/E4/E5 and the OQO computers (2005).  MegaVision currently produces a 10 band visible plus 365 nm UV and 5 band IR EurekaVision lighting system initially developed for their 39 megapixel Monochrome camera back.
Outside of US and Canada, MegaVision products are officially distributed in Asia through Megavision International Pte Ltd. and in EMEA COUNTRIES through TechVision

Products

Digital backs

single shot

E series 
E2 4 megapixel non-mydriatic diabetic retinopathy
E3/E427 6/11-megapixel ophthalmic 
E7 50-megapixel
Monochrome and Bayer pattern Color

S series (discontinued)
Color information is obtained with a color filter array in front of the sensor 
S4 16-megapixel 36 mm square CCD sensor with 9 µm pixel size 
S3 / S3pro 6-megapixel 24 mm x 26 mm CCD sensor with 12 µm pixel size 
S2 4-megapixel 31 mm square CCD sensor with 15 µm pixel size

Three-shot (discontinued)
Color information is obtained in three consecutive exposures through a red, green, and blue filter
T32 
T2

Multi-Spectral
EurekaVision LED lighting system: 
365 nm UV , 447 nm, 470 nm, 505 nm, 530 nm, 590 nm, 625 nm, 655 nm Visibles, 700 nm, 730 nm, 780 nm, 850 nm, 860 nm, 940 nm 1050 nm IRs
120mm f4.5 UV-VIS-IR Apo Macro, 320 nm-1100 nm, MegaVision Electronic Shutter System
Single and Double filter wheel systems for detecting and characterizing fluorescence emission

Software
Photoshoot capture software for Windows 7 and 8

Other companies with similar products
Similar digital backs are manufactured / sold by Hasselblad, Leaf, and Phase One.

References

External links
 article on Digital-Photography.org 
 article in Shutterbug on pro-quality digital SLRs from 2001 
 article by John Henshall from 1998 
 article by Philip Greenspun on digital cameras and image sensors 
PRI article by Noel King on St. Catherines Monastery  palimpsest library translation 
web page by Rob Beschizza on Declaration of Independence correction 
web page by Adrian S. Wisnicki on Livingstone Field Diary 
web page by Mary Downs on Martellus Map Project 
web page article by Stephanie Pappas on Burnt Magna Carta 
web page video of EurekaVision system in use at Dead Sea Scrolls' Israeli Antiquities Authority studio lab 

Photography companies of the United States
Digital camera backs